Michael Nigel Sheron (born 11 January 1972) is an English football coach and former professional footballer who is under-23's head coach at Blackburn Rovers.

As a player, he was a striker who notably played in the Premier League for Manchester City and Norwich City. He also played in the Football League for Bury, Stoke City, Queens Park Rangers, Barnsley, Blackpool, Macclesfield Town and Shrewsbury Town. Sheron was capped by England at under-21 level.

Career
Sheron started his career with Manchester City, whom he joined as a schoolboy. His first league appearance came in March 1991 on loan at Bury, for whom he played five times. His Manchester City debut came in the 1991–92 season in a match against Everton. Sheron a total of 29 appearances over the course of the season, scoring seven times. The majority of Sheron's Manchester City appearances were in a striking partnership with Niall Quinn, particularly in the 1992–93 season when Sheron scored 14 goals. Following the arrival of Paul Walsh and Uwe Rösler in March 1994, Sheron's first team opportunities become limited, and in August 1994 he joined Norwich City for a fee of £1,000,000. His time at Norwich was not a happy one. Struggling with injuries, Sheron scored just two league goals for Norwich, and moved to Stoke City in October 1995 in a player exchange deal that took Keith Scott to Carrow Road. Sheron performed considerably better for Stoke, scoring 39 goals in 71 starts, including a brace in the last ever Potteries derby match at the Victoria Ground.

His success at Stoke prompted Queens Park Rangers to pay £2.75 million for his services. After 18 months at QPR, the club were facing financial difficulties, and as one of the highest wage earners, Sheron was sold to Barnsley for £1.5 million. Sheron spent four years at Barnsley, making more appearances for them than for any of his other clubs.

Towards the end of his playing career Sheron had short spells at several lower division clubs, playing for Blackpool, Macclesfield and Shrewsbury. At Blackpool he started the final as Blackpool won the 2003–04 Football League Trophy.

After leaving Shrewsbury, Sheron signed for Warrington Town of the Northern Premier League who he briefly played for before hanging up his boots to join the club's coaching staff.

Coaching career
Sheron started his coaching career with Manchester City's Academy before moving to Bury where he served as Youth Team manager for three years. After a year working with Oldham Athletic, Sheron joined the coaching staff at Liverpool's Academy before making the switch to Rotherham United as academy head coach. In March 2015 he joined Blackburn Rovers as their Lead Youth Development Coach. In August 2019 Sheron was appointed head coach for Blackburn Rovers under 18s

Personal life

Sheron is the uncle of Oldham Athletic defender Nathan Sheron.

Career statistics

Honours
Blackpool
Football League Trophy: 2003–04

Individual
First Division PFA Team of the Year: 1996–97

References

External links
 

1972 births
Living people
English footballers
England under-21 international footballers
Association football forwards
Manchester City F.C. players
Bury F.C. players
Norwich City F.C. players
Stoke City F.C. players
Queens Park Rangers F.C. players
Barnsley F.C. players
Blackpool F.C. players
Macclesfield Town F.C. players
Shrewsbury Town F.C. players
Warrington Town F.C. players
Premier League players
English Football League players
Footballers from Liverpool
Manchester City F.C. non-playing staff
Bury F.C. non-playing staff
Oldham Athletic A.F.C. non-playing staff
Liverpool F.C. non-playing staff
Rotherham United F.C. non-playing staff
Blackburn Rovers F.C. non-playing staff